Ambassadors of Israel to The Gambia have included:

List of Ambassadors

Ben Burgel 2021
Roi Rosenblit (Non-Resident, Dakar) 2018 - 
Paul Hirschson (Non-Resident, Dakar) 2015 - 2018 
Eytan Ruppin (Non-Resident, Dakar) 1967 - 1969
Hanan Aynor 1964 - 1967

References 

Gambia
Israel